WFIW-FM 104.9 FM is a radio station broadcasting an adult hits format. Licensed to Fairfield, Illinois, the station is owned by The Original Company, Inc.

History
WFIW-FM began broadcasting on August 18, 1965. The station was originally owned by Thomas Smoot Land and Bryan Davidson, doing business as Wayne County Broadcasting Company. In May 1974, Thomas Land would take sole ownership of the station, and would later pass ownership of the station to his son, Dave Land. In 2012, Land sold WFIW-FM, along with WFIW 1390 and WOKZ, to The Original Company for $962,766.67.

The station originally had an ERP of 3 kw at an HAAT of 197 feet. In 1979, its HAAT was increased to 273 ft. The station originally simulcast the programming of WFIW 1390, but on February 15, 1983 the simulcast ended, and the station began airing an adult contemporary format independent of its AM sister station. In 1985, the station had begun airing a CHR format as "I-105". By 1988, the station would return to airing an adult contemporary format. In 1993, the station's format was changed from adult contemporary to oldies. In September 1999, the station's format was changed to soft AC. In 2009, the station's format was changed to adult hits.

Former Programming
WFIW as a CHR station is a former affiliate of Dan Ingram's Top 40 Satellite Survey.

References

External links
WFIW's official website

FIW-FM
Adult hits radio stations in the United States
Radio stations established in 1965
1965 establishments in Illinois